Raúl Ramírez (28 January 1927, in Guadalajara – 22 June 2014, in Mexico City) was a veteran Mexican actor.

Jooj Natu

Selected filmography

Film
La Hora Desnuda (1971)
Todo el Horizonte Para Morir (1971)
Secreto de Confesion (1971)
La Satanica (1973)
Blue Demon and Zovek in the Invasion of the Dead (1973)

Television
La Satanica 1971
Penthouse (telenovela) 1973
Estafa de amor
Lucía Sombra
Cuando los hijos se van (telenovela)
A Few Drinks

References

1927 births
2014 deaths
Mexican male television actors